Il Sodoma (1477 – 14 February 1549) was the name given to the Italian Renaissance painter Giovanni Antonio Bazzi. Il Sodoma painted in a manner that superimposed the High Renaissance style of early 16th-century Rome onto the traditions of the provincial Sienese school; he spent the bulk of his professional life in Siena, with two periods in Rome.

Biography
Giovanni Bazzi was born in Vercelli, Piedmont, in 1477. His first master was the "archaic" Martino Spanzotti; he also appears to have been a student of the painter Giovenone. After acquiring the strong colouring and other distinctive stylistic features of the Lombard school and – though he is not known to have travelled to Milan – somehow absorbing the superficial mannerisms of Leonardo (Freedberg 1993:117), he travelled to Siena before 1503, perhaps at the behest of agents of the Spannocchi family, and began with fresco cycles for Olivetan monks and a series of small Ovidian ceiling panels and a frieze depicting the career of Julius Caesar for Sigismondo Chigi at Palazzo Chigi.

 Along with Pinturicchio, Sodoma was one of the first to practice in Siena the style of the High Renaissance. His first important works were frescoes in the Benedictine monastery of Monte Oliveto Maggiore, on the road from Siena to Rome, illustrating the life of St Benedict in continuation of the series that Luca Signorelli had begun in 1498. Gaining fluency in the prevailing popular style of Pinturicchio, Sodoma completed the set in 1502 and included a self-portrait with badgers and ravens. 

Sodoma was invited to Rome in 1508 by the celebrated Sienese merchant Agostino Chigi and was employed there by Pope Julius II in the Stanza della Segnatura in the Vatican. He executed two great compositions and various ornaments and grotesques in vaulted ceilings divided in feigned compartments in the antique manner that Pinturicchio had recently revived, working at the same time as Raphael. Vasari's rhetorical story that Sodoma's larger works did not satisfy the pope, who engaged Raphael to substitute a program of Justice, Poetry, and Theology is not borne out by the documents.

Before October 1510 he was in Siena, where he painted the exterior of Palazzo Chigi in monochrome chiaroscuro with scenes from the Bible and from Antiquity, the first such work seen in Siena (Bartalini 2001:553). His painting at this time began to show distinct Florentine influences, especially of Fra Bartolommeo.

Called again to Rome by Chigi, in the Villa Chigi (now the Villa Farnesina), working alongside Baldassarre Peruzzi, Sodoma painted subjects from the life of Alexander the Great: Alexander in the Tent of Darius and the Nuptials of the Conqueror with Roxanne, which some people consider his masterpiece. When Leo X became pope (1513), Sodoma presented him with a picture of the Death of Lucretia (or of Cleopatra, according to some accounts). Leo gave him a large sum of money as a reward and created him a cavaliere.

In his youth, Bazzi had married, but he and his wife soon separated. A daughter married Bartolomeo Neroni, called also Riccio Sanese or Maestro Riccio, one of his principal pupils. 
Bazzi acquired his nickname of Il Sodoma, as it were "the sodomite", from as early as 1512.
This appears to have been one among various nicknames, he was also known as Mattaccio or Matazo ("the madman") among the monks of Monte Oliveto.
It is due to the contemporary art historian Giorgio Vasari that Bazzi's nickname of Il Sodoma has become conventional. 
According to Vasari's testimony, Bazzi always surrounded himself with "boys and beardless youths, whom he loved more than was decent", for which reason he acquired the nickname Il Soddoma. 
Still, according to Vasari, Bazzi took pride in the nickname and composed stanzas and songs about it.

Bazzi returned to Siena and, at a later date, sought work in Pisa, Volterra, and Lucca. From Lucca, he returned to Siena not long before his death on 14 February 1549 (older narratives say 1554). He had supposedly squandered his property and is said, without documentary support, to have died in penury in the great hospital of Siena. One of his pupils is known as Giomo del Sodoma.

Work

Some critics see in Sodoma's Madonna in the Pinacoteca di Brera (if it really is by him) the direct influence of this master. Modern criticism tends not to follow Morelli in supposing that Raphael painted Sodoma's portrait next to himself in The School of Athens, while a drawing at Christ Church is supposed to be a portrait of Raphael by Sodoma.

Among his masterpieces are the frescoes, completed in 1526, in the chapel of St. Catherine of Siena painted for the church of San Domenico (Siena), depicting the saint in ecstasy, fainting as she receives the Eucharist from an angel. In the Oratory of San Bernardino, are scenes from the history of the Virgin, painted in conjunction with Pacchia and Beccafumi (1536–1538). These frescoes depict the Visitation and the Assumption. In San Francesco are the Deposition from the Cross (1513) and Christ Scourged.  Many critics regard one or the other of these paintings as Sodoma's masterpiece. In the choir of the Pisa Cathedral is the Sacrifice of Abraham, and in the Uffizi Gallery of Florence a St. Sebastian.

Some of his works, including the Holy Family now in the Pinacoteca, Siena have been mistaken for works of Leonardo da Vinci. His easel pictures are rare; there are two in the National Gallery, London.

Partial list of works
Flagellation of Christ (1510) - Museum of Fine Arts, Budapest 
The Road to Calvary (1510) -  Museum of Fine Arts, Budapest 
Cinuzzi Deposition (before 1513) - Pinacoteca, Siena 
The Death of Lucretia (1513) - Museum of Fine Arts, Budapest
Saint George and Dragon (1518) - National Gallery of Art, Washington, D.C.
Rape of the Sabine Women (1525) - Galleria Nazionale d'Arte Antica, Rome 
St. Sebastian (1525) - Oil on canvas, 206 x 154 cm Galleria degli Uffizi, Florence
Three Fates (1525) -Galleria Nazionale d'Arte Antica Rome
Adoration of the Magi (c. 1530) -  Sant'Agostino, Siena
Ordination of Saint Alfonso (1530) - Santo Spirito, Siena 
Crying for dead Christ or Pietà (1533) - Museo Soumaya, Mexico City  
Saint Jerome in Penitence (c.1535-1545) - National Gallery, London 
The Holy Family with Saint John the Baptist and an Angel (c.1535-1545) - Musée des Beaux-Arts, Strasbourg 
The Mystical Marriage of Saint Catherine (1539–1540) -  Galleria Nazionale d'Arte Antica, Rome
Pietà (1540) - Galleria Borghese, Rome  
Sacra Conversazione  (1542) - Museo Nazionale di San Matteo, Pisa
Saint Sebastian with Madonna and Angels (1542) -  Museo Nazionale di San Matteo, Pisa
Allegory of Celestial Love, Chigi-Saracini Collection, Siena
Leda Galleria Borghese, Roma
Santa Maddalena (Collezione privata)
The Marriage of Alexander and Roxanne - Fresco, Villa Farnesina, Rome
Procession to Calvary - Museum & Gallery, Inc., South Carolina
Pietà (Collezione privata)

Critical assessments
It is said that Sodoma jeered at Giorgio Vasari's Lives of the Artists and that Vasari repaid him by presenting a negative account of Sodoma's morals and demeanour and withholding praise of his work. According to Vasari, the name by which Bazzi was known was "Il Mattaccio" (the Madcap, the Maniac), this epithet having been bestowed upon him by the monks of Monte Oliveto. He dressed gaudily, like a mountebank, and his house was a Noah's ark, owing to the strange miscellany of animals he kept there. He was a cracker of jokes and fond of music, and he sang poems composed by himself on indecorous subjects.

Vasari alleges that Sodoma was always a negligent artist, his early success in Siena, where he painted many portraits, being partly due to lack of competition, a judgment in which Sydney Freedberg concurs. Vasari asserts that as he aged, he became too "lazy" to make cartoons for his frescoes but daubed them straight onto the wall. Vasari nevertheless admits that Sodoma produced some works of very fine quality and that during his lifetime his reputation was high.

Notes

References

Zarucchi, Jeanne Morgan (2015). "Vasari's Biography of Bazzi as 'Soddoma:' Art History and Literary Analysis," Italian Studies, Vol. 70, No. 2 (May 2015), pp. 167-190.
Zarucchi, Jeanne Morgan (2017). "Félibien's Biography of 'Le Sodoma' and the Politics of Immorality," French Studies Bulletin, Vol. 38.1, No. 142 (Spring 2017), pp. 7-10.

External links

Leonardo da Vinci: anatomical drawings from the Royal Library, Windsor Castle, exhibition catalog fully online as PDF from The Metropolitan Museum of Art, which contains material on Il Sodoma (see index)

1477 births
1540s deaths
15th-century Italian painters
16th-century Italian painters
Gay painters
Italian gay artists
Italian LGBT painters
Painters from Piedmont
Painters from Siena
Italian male painters
Italian Mannerist painters
Italian Renaissance painters
People from Vercelli